California's transportation system is complex and dynamic. Although known for its car culture and extensive network of freeways and roads, the state also has a vast array of rail, sea, and air transport. Several subway, light rail, and commuter rail networks are found in many of the state's largest population centers. In addition, with the state's location on the West Coast of the United States, several important ports in California handle freight shipments from the Pacific Rim and beyond. A number of airports are also spread out across the state, ranging from small general aviation airports to large international hubs like Los Angeles International Airport and San Francisco International Airport.

However, in a state with over 39 million people, rapid population expansion, and diverse terrain and weather, that system is under pressure to stay ahead of population growth and transportation needs.

Roads and highways

California is known for its car culture; by the end of 2010, the California Department of Motor Vehicles had 23,799,513 driver's licenses and a total of 31,987,821 registered vehicles on file. The state's residents typically take to the roads for their commutes, errands, and vacations, giving California's cities a reputation for severe traffic congestion.

California's vast terrain is connected by an extensive system of freeways, expressways, and highways, all maintained by the California Department of Transportation (Caltrans) and patrolled by the California Highway Patrol (CHP), except for the numbered expressways in Santa Clara County which were built and maintained by the county itself. The main north–south arteries are U.S. Route 101 (US 101), which travels close to the coast from Downtown Los Angeles, across the Golden Gate Bridge, and to the Oregon state line, and Interstate 5 (I-5), which travels inland from the Mexico–United States border to the Oregon state line, effectively bisecting the entire state. In addition, a major north–south artery is State Route 99 (SR 99), which travels from near Bakersfield to near Red Bluff; SR 99 is largely parallel to I-5, and connects the Central Valley cities not connected by the Interstate.

Perhaps it is a testament to California's sheer size that although it has one of the most extensive freeway systems in the United States, it contains many of the largest cities in the United States not served by an Interstate Highway, including the two largest, Fresno (pop. 471,479) and Bakersfield (pop. 247,057). These cities, along with Modesto and Visalia, are passed by as I-5 veers west to avoid the congestion of the populated eastern side of the Central Valley as it connects Sacramento and Los Angeles.

The state's freeway network has expanded ever since the Arroyo Seco Parkway, the first freeway in the Western United States, connecting Los Angeles and Pasadena, opened in 1940. However, the state is not immune to freeway revolts, such as those that have prevented a freeway in San Francisco between the Golden Gate Bridge and the San Francisco–Oakland Bay Bridge, and an expansion of I-710 through South Pasadena.

Traffic signs, road surface markings, and traffic signals on all public streets and highways throughout the state are regulated by the California Vehicle Code and standardized in the California Manual on Uniform Traffic Control Devices.

Toll roads and bridges

Almost all California highways are non-toll roads, including several major non-toll bridges in Los Angeles, Sacramento, and San Diego. However, there are four toll roads in Southern California, and eight toll bridges in the San Francisco Bay Area (including the state's most famous highway bridge, the Golden Gate Bridge). These toll facilities, along with several high-occupancy toll lanes, use the statewide electronic toll collection system known as FasTrak.

Interstate Highways

Primary Interstate Highways in California include:

Auxiliary (three-digit) Interstates are located in the Greater Los Angeles area, the Bay Area, and the San Diego Area:
Greater Los Angeles Area

  Interstate 105
  Interstate 110
  Interstate 210
  Interstate 215
  Interstate 405
  Interstate 605
  Interstate 710

San Francisco Bay Area

  Interstate 205
  Interstate 238
  Interstate 280
  Interstate 380
  Interstate 505
  Interstate 580
  Interstate 680
  Interstate 780
  Interstate 880
  Interstate 980

San Diego Area
  Interstate 805

U.S. Routes

The following are United States Numbered Highways in California:

California still uses an older, cut-out version of the U.S. Route shield instead of the current design used in the other U.S. states, printed on a square blank with a black background.

State Routes

State highways in California range from one-lane rural roads to full urban freeways. Each state highway is assigned a Route (officially State Highway Route) number in the Streets and Highways Code (Sections 300–635). However, the state is also currently relinquishing a number of non-freeway segments, especially in urban areas, and turning them over to local control.

The standard California state route marker consists of a white numeral on a green shield, with the name "California" displayed above the numeral. The shield is shaped like a miners' spade to honor the California Gold Rush.

Major long-distance, intercity state routes include:

County Routes

County routes in California are controlled and maintained by the respective counties in which they reside, but are normally patrolled by the California Highway Patrol like any other state highway. Each county route is prefixed with a letter, depending on the region of the state (e.g. G2). Routes with letters A, B, and D are in the region of Northern California; letters E, G, and J are in Central California; and N, R, and S are in Southern California. County routes can range from two-lane roads to the full expressways found in Santa Clara County.

Rail travel

Although known for its car culture, California also has a number of local and regional passenger rail systems, including the following:

Amtrak

Amtrak California is a collection of services supported by Amtrak and the California Department of Transportation. The three busiest intercity rail lines in the US outside the Northeast Corridor operate under this branding: the Capitol Corridor connects the San Francisco Bay Area to Sacramento; the Pacific Surfliner runs along the coast of Southern California from San Diego to San Luis Obispo; and the San Joaquin connects the major cities of the Central Valley with the Bay Area.

National Amtrak lines include the California Zephyr from Emeryville to Chicago, Illinois; the Coast Starlight from Los Angeles to Seattle, Washington; the Southwest Chief and the Texas Eagle from Los Angeles to Chicago; and the Sunset Limited from Los Angeles to New Orleans, Louisiana.

Bus travel

Local transit service is found in every county, from Los Angeles to Alpine County. Some local bus transit agencies like the San Francisco Muni and the Orange County Transportation Authority primarily only serve a specific city or county, while other agencies like AC Transit in the San Francisco Bay Area and the San Diego Metropolitan Transit System serve a specific region regardless of city or county borders.

Intercity bus travel is provided by Greyhound, Megabus and Amtrak Thruway Motorcoach.

Major transit hubs that serve multiple bus and rail systems include Los Angeles Union Station, San Diego Santa Fe Depot, San Jose Diridon station, and Sacramento Valley Station.

Bicycle travel

There are numerous bike routes in California such as the Los Angeles River bicycle path in the Greater Los Angeles Area and the San Francisco Bay Trail in the San Francisco Bay Area. Caltrans uses three classes to segregate cycle facilities:
 Class I: Bike path - completely segregated from traffic
 Class II: Bike lane - a lane set aside in city streets exclusively for bikes
 Class III: Bike route - a regular surface street that is designated as being safe or attractive to bicyclists

Many of the state's local public transportation systems are bicycle accessible. Numerous buses are equipped with bicycle racks at the front of the vehicle for the attachment of approximately two bicycles. Several rail systems such as the Metro Rail and BART also allow riders to carry bikes onto the trains during certain hours of the day.

Air travel

Los Angeles International Airport (LAX) and San Francisco International Airport (SFO) are major hubs for both international and transcontinental traffic. In 2011, LAX and SFO were the sixth and 22nd busiest airports in the world by passenger count, respectively.

San Diego, Oakland, John Wayne/Orange County, Sacramento, and San Jose are also among the 50 busiest airports in the United States. In total, there are about a dozen important commercial airports and many more general aviation airports throughout the state's 58 counties.

The following table shows all California airports designated by the FAA as large hubs and medium hubs that have more than 3,000 enplanements annually:

Seaports and harbors

California also has several important seaports. The giant seaport complex formed by the Port of Los Angeles and the Port of Long Beach in Southern California is the largest in the country and responsible for handling about a fourth of all container cargo traffic in the United States. The Port of Oakland handles most of the ocean containers passing through Northern California.  The Port of Redwood City, the Port of Richmond, and the Port of San Diego are also significant ports for freight shipments. The Port of Sacramento and the Port of Stockton are two major inland deepwater ports located in the Central Valley, and thus only accessible via the Sacramento–San Joaquin River Delta. Instead of dredging the Sacramento River, the Sacramento Deep Water Ship Channel was built in 1963 to accommodate large ships traveling from the delta to Sacramento.

A number of ferry services take commuters across San Francisco Bay from San Francisco to other communities in the Bay Area. Ferry service is also available for commuters crossing San Diego Bay from San Diego to Coronado. Passenger ferries also serve the offshore city of Avalon on Santa Catalina Island. There is no regular vehicle ferry service to Avalon, however, since the city restricts the use of cars and trucks within its borders.

Numerous local harbors are spread out across the Pacific Coast, San Francisco Bay, San Diego Bay, and the Sacramento – San Joaquin River Delta for commercial fishing or recreational use.

Current issues

Because of the state's population growth, many settlements that were once small or rural communities in the 1940s and 50s, when much of California's transportation infrastructure was originally designed, are now thriving suburbs and exurbs. According to a 2011 study by Forbes, the cities of Lake Elsinore, Los Banos, Adelanto, and Brentwood were ranked as the top four longest commutes in the country.

A regularly recurring issue in California politics is whether the state should continue to aggressively expand its freeway network or concentrate on improving mass transit networks in urban areas. BART, LA Metro Rail, and several other public transportation systems have expansion plans either currently under construction or in the planning stages. Several HOT lanes across the state are also either currently under construction or in the planning stages.

Reloadable contactless smart card systems, allowing electronic fare payments on various public transportation systems, have been introduced since 2007, such as the Clipper Card in the San Francisco Bay Area, the Transit Access Pass in Los Angeles County, and the Compass Card (later replaced in 2021 by the Pronto card) in San Diego County.

The California High-Speed Rail Authority was created in 1996 by the state to implement an extensive 700 mile (1127 km) rail system. It would provide a TGV-style high-speed link between the state's four major metropolitan areas, and would allow travel between Los Angeles' Union Station and the San Francisco Transbay Terminal in two and a half hours. Voters approved Proposition 1A in November 2008, approving a $9 billion state bond to finance the project. Then in 2012, the California legislature and Governor Jerry Brown approved construction financing for an initial stage of the project. The High Speed Rail Authority estimates that an initial stage will be completed in 2029. The project has been widely described as troubled, being far behind schedule and suffering from management turmoil, problems with procuring land, and engineering issues.

Traffic safety considerations

Texas and California are comparable being the two largest states in the contiguous United States as California contains 39 million inhabitants. This results in these states to have higher traffic fatalities than other states.

There were more traffic fatalities in California than in Texas until 2007. Since 2017, there have been less fatalities in California than in Texas.

California Housing Crisis and Climate Change
In California, around 40% of the state's greenhouse gas emissions are from vehicle transportation, and this number is increasing. Distant suburbs such as Stockton, and Modesto have the two highest percentages of residents who are super commuters in the United States, at around 11% of Stockton residents, and 9% of Modesto residents commuting over 90 minutes to get to work. The transportation problem is beginning to threaten the state's future goals in terms of emissions and carbon neutrality. By 2030, California hopes to limit greenhouse gases to 40% below 1990 levels, and hopes to achieve carbon neutrality by 2045. As time goes on, however, these goals are becoming increasingly difficult to reach unless the state takes significant measures to combat their transportation problem. With 1.7 million renting households in California spending half their income on rent, California has a housing crisis that is impacting their climate goals. Infill housing is seen as a solution to build more affordable housing in coastal cities where people would not need to drive to work or other errands. Senate Bill 50, The More Homes Act is waiting to be voted on, and attempts to address the housing crisis by overriding local zoning codes to legalize small apartment buildings (up to 5 stories) in urban areas near jobs and public transportation. Caltrans plans to work on their infrastructure to make sustainable transportation methods such as trains, biking, and walking more accessible to more people. In 2008, California passed a law requiring communities to alter their land use and transportation plans to actively combat climate change, however, statistically the bill has done little to change the state's emissions. Caltrans has acknowledged that extreme wildfires and floods, driven by climate change, have plagued California in recent years which has impacted transportation infrastructure. In 2013 Caltrans released the "Caltrans Activities to Address Climate Change- Reducing Greenhouse Gas Emissions and Adapting to Impacts" report, which highlighted statewide efforts to address climate related damage.

See also

Plug-in electric vehicles in California
Sig Alert
Vehicle registration plates of California

Transportation history
Highway system
Maritime
Rail transportation

Transportation by region
Transportation in the Inland Empire
Transportation in Kern County
Transportation in Los Angeles
Transportation in the Sacramento metropolitan area
Transportation in San Diego County
Transportation in the San Francisco Bay Area

References

External links
 CalTrans traffic map
 California Rail Map

Regional 5-1-1 links
 Inland Empire
 Los Angeles Area
 Sacramento Area
 San Diego Area
 San Francisco Bay Area
 San Joaquin Valley
 San Luis Obispo Area
 Santa Cruz Area